Pine Forest High School is a public high school in Fayetteville, North Carolina. It is situated on Andrews Road, close to Howard Hall Elementary School, Pine Forest Middle School, and the Methodist University. The mascot for Pine Forest is the Trojan warrior.

Athletics 
Pine Forest is a part of the North Carolina High School Athletic Association (NCHSAA) as a 4A school, and is a member of the All-American 3A/4A conference.

Fall Sports 
 Boys’ Junior Varsity Football
 Boys’ Varsity Football
 Boys’ Junior Varsity Soccer
 Boys’ Varsity Soccer
 Girls’ Golf
 Girls’ Tennis
 Girls’ Junior Varsity Volleyball
 Girls’ Varsity Volleyball
 Cross Country

Winter Sports 
 Boys’ Junior Varsity Basketball
 Boys’ Varsity Basketball
 Girls’ Junior Varsity Basketball
 Girls’ Varsity Basketball
 Swimming
 Wrestling
 Bowling

Spring Sports 
 Boys’ Junior Varsity Baseball
 Boys’ Varsity Baseball
 Girls’ Junior Varsity Softball
 Girls’ Varsity Softball
 Girls’ Junior Varsity Soccer
 Girls’ Varsity Soccer
 Varsity Track and Field
 Boys’ Golf
 Boys’ Tennis

Notable alumni
Daniel Alvarez, professional soccer player
Crystal Cox, track athlete who represented the USA at the 2004 Summer Olympics
Charles Davenport, former NFL wide receiver (1992–1994)
Lamont Gaillard, current NFL center (2019–)
Tearrius George, Canadian Football League defensive end (2007–2016)
Naomi Graham, middleweight boxer, first female active duty service member to compete for U.S. at the Olympics
Martin Jarmond, college athletics administrator
Harold Landry, current NFL linebacker (2018–)
Ernie Logan, former NFL defensive lineman (1991–2000)
Alvin Powell, NFL offensive lineman (1987–1989) and current drug awareness and substance abuse speaker
Bracy Walker, former NFL safety (1994–2005)
Wallace Wright, former NFL wide receiver (2006–2012)
Christopher Watts, Colorado man who murdered his wife and two daughters in 2018

References 

Schools in Cumberland County, North Carolina
Public high schools in North Carolina